Ronald Ataides Langón (born 6 August 1939) is a Uruguayan football midfielder who played for Uruguay in the 1962 FIFA World Cup. He also played for Defensor Sporting.

References

External links
 FIFA profile

1939 births
Uruguayan footballers
Uruguay international footballers
Association football midfielders
Uruguayan Primera División players
Defensor Sporting players
1962 FIFA World Cup players
Living people